Khokhar is a village in the Gujrat Tehsil of the Gujrat District of Punjab, Pakistan, located approximately 5 miles north of the City of Gujrat.

History
The village gets its name from the Khokhar tribe, who make up the bulk of the population. A famous tomb of Baba Jhanghu Shah is located in Khokhar.

Demographics
According to the 1998 census of Pakistan, its population was 2351.

References 

Populated places in Gujrat District